Farid Karam Nassar (born June 23, 1972), better known by his stage name Fredwreck, is a Grammy Award-winning American hip hop recording artist, DJ and record producer. He got his big break when he became a producer for Dr. Dre's newly founded record label Aftermath Entertainment, and then went on to work with Snoop Dogg's record label Dogghouse Records (now Doggystyle Records) and became a known producer on Tha Dogg Pound-affiliated material. During this time he also was a producer for Snoop Doggs track: Riders on the storm Ft The Doors on EA's Need for speed underground 2. He has produced tracks from Kurupt's Tha Streetz Iz a Mutha and most of his next release, Space Boogie: Smoke Oddessey; both released during the period the rapper had left Death Row Records. He has also produced for other hip-hop and pop artists such as Eminem, Britney Spears, Ice Cube, Westside Connection, Lil' Kim, Hilary Duff, Xzibit, The Game, Nate Dogg, Everlast, Cypress Hill, 50 Cent, Mobb Deep, as well as non-US acts such as Dizzie Rascal, Tamer Hosny, Qusai Kheder and Karl Wolf.

Early life 
The first child of Aida Kaileh and Karam Nassar, Fredwreck was born on June 23, 1972, in Flint, Michigan. His parents are Palestinians and left to the United States in 1966 by boat. Farid has three brothers Robert, Salam who is also a DJ, and Omar.

His father worked as a tool and die maker for AC Spark Plug, a General Motors division, and later moved the family to San Jose, California, to open his own grocery store business.

Music career
Inspired by producers Dr. Dre, Mantronix, Marley Marl, and The Bomb Squad, Fredwreck began experimenting with production equipment, recording techniques, and his skills as a DJ to carve out his own sound. The influence of East Coast hip hop, West Coast hip hop, electro, soul, funk, Middle Eastern and rock music helped give him a signature sound. From 1995 to 1997 he was hired by Bomb Squad producer Hank Shocklee as an A&R executive at MCA/Universal Records where he oversaw the recordings of artists such as Mary J. Blige, Aaliyah, Immature, Al Green, King Tee, Shai, Bobby Brown and Soundtracks such as Dangerous Minds, Tales from the Hood, and others.

After leaving MCA/Universal, Fredwreck decided to concentrate fully on production. He would give out his production CD to anyone that would listen, and it eventually ended up with Dr. Dre who called Fredwreck to come in and collaborate with him in the studio which then led to him working on the multi-platinum selling album 2001. His roommate at the time Xzibit introduced him to Soopafly, who then also passed his beat CD on to members of the Dogg Pound, Daz and Kurupt which led to his production on the Kurupt album Tha Streetz Iz a Mutha and the chance to work with Snoop Dogg. Snoop then asked Fredwreck to join Doggystyle Records imprint as a producer which led to production on Snoop's albums, and artists on his label such as Tha Eastsidaz.

In 2007, he partnered up with songwriter Kara DioGuardi to produce songs for pop stars Britney Spears and Hilary Duff. He received an MTV Europe Music Award for Best Album for his production on Britney's Blackout album and Kara went on to be the new judge on American Idol.

Discography 

 2002 (Tha Dogg Pound album)
 Blacc Balled
 Blackout (Britney Spears album)
 Blood Money (Mobb Deep album)
 Tha Blue Carpet Treatment
 Bones (soundtrack)
 Cheers (Obie Trice album)
 Dignity (album)
 The Documentary 2
 Tha Dogg Pound Gangsta LP
 Doggumentary
 DPGC: U Know What I'm Throwin' Up
 Duces 'n Trayz: The Old Fashioned Way
 Eat at Whitey's
 Everythang's Corrupt
 Gemini: Good vs. Evil
 The General's List
 Get Rich or Die Tryin' (soundtrack)
 Ghetto Postage
 Ghetto Therapy
 Goodfellas (504 Boyz album)
 Greatest Hits from the Bong
 Guerilla City      
 The Hard Way (213 album)
 Held Up (soundtrack)
 Hustla's Handbook
 I Wanna Thank Me
 The King & I (Faith Evans and The Notorious B.I.G. album)
 The Kingdom Come
 L.A. Confidential presents: Knoc-turn'al
 Malibu's Most Wanted (soundtrack)
 Music & Me (Nate Dogg album)
 Nate Dogg (album)
 The Naked Truth (Lil' Kim album)
 Next Friday (soundtrack)        
 Paid tha Cost to Be da Boss
 Personal Business (album)
 Pleezbaleevit!
 Rap Life
 Restless (Xzibit album)
 Revenge of the Barracuda
 Revival (Eminem album)
 Rhapsody (Mr. Mike album)
 Searching for Jerry Garcia
 Section 8 (album)
 The Sneak Attack
 Snoop Dogg Presents... Doggy Style Allstars Vol. 1
 Soft White
 Space Boogie: Smoke Oddessey
 Stash (EP)
 Still Up in This Shit!
 Super Saucy
 The Substitute (soundtrack)
 Terrorist Threats
 Tha Streetz Iz a Mutha
 Till Death Do Us Part (Cypress Hill album)
 Ventilation: Da LP
 Wake Up & Ball
 When Hell.A. Freezes Over
 When We Wuz Bangin' 1989–1999: The Hitz
 Who Ride wit Us: Tha Compalation, Vol. 1
 Who Ride wit Us: Tha Compalation, Vol. 2

MTV Arabia 

The launch of MTV Arabia in 2007 brought FredWreck to his roots in the Middle East, where he co-hosted (Hip HopNa) a hip hop talent search across Arabia with friend and partner Qusai (aka Don Legend the Kamelion).  The first season led to the discovery of Arab rappers such as Omar Boflot. Desert Heat, Asfalt, Malikah and others.  The program reached 180 million viewers and is the first such program of its kind.

WaNaSaH TV 
In 2009, Fredwreck hosted a weekly Arabic Hip Hop Show called "Beit el Hip Hop" or "The House of Hip Hop" beside the Saudi Arabian hip hop artist Qusai aka Don legend the Kamelion.

Gumball 3000

In the Gumball 3000 2007 rally, FredWreck and Xzibit drove a black Jaguar XJ220. During the first day of the rally, Dutch police seized Xzibits driver's license for doing 160 km/h where only 100 km/h was allowed. After the penalty,  FredWreck took over the wheel and they were allowed to continue. In an interview with Dutch radio personality Reinout 'Q-Bah' van Gendt, Xzibit says that he mistook the kilometers for miles. Ultimately he never got his license back from the Dutch Police and had to apply for a new one in the United States.

Stop The Oppressive Politics
The STOP Movement was started by Fredwreck on April 19, 2003. It was created to inform the world about the Iraq War. To reach more people, Fredwreck produced a series of songs with multiple artists including Everlast, Tray Deee. Defari, J-Ro, RBX, Daz Dillinger, Soopafly, Bad Azz, WC, Dilated Peoples, The Mac Minister, Mack 10, Evidence, Cypress Hill, the Alchemist, Mobb Deep and others.

"Down with us" is the first song in the STOP Movement. It is also the anthem for this anti-war movement. It was released on April 28, 2003. Produced by Fredwreck, it features Everlast, Tray Deee, Defari, Daz, J-Ro, RBX, Soopafly, Bad Azz, WC, Dilated Peoples, and Mac Minister.

Dear Mr. President is the second STOP Movement song. It was released as a digital download on Fredwreck's official site. Also produced by Fredwreck, it features Everlast, Mobb Deep, the Alchemist, Mack 10, WC, Evidence, Defari, KRS-One, and B-Real.

2016 
In the fall of 2016, VH1 premiered a new show with Snoop Dogg, Martha Stewart and Fredwreck called Martha & Snoop's Potluck Dinner Party, featuring games, recipes, and musical guests. Fredwreck, Snoop & Martha later starred together in commercials for 7up and Snickers. In a 2016 interview with The New York Times, Martha called Fred "Her new best friend".

2020
On January 26, 2020 Fredwreck received a Grammy Award for Best R&B Album of the year for his production on the Anderson Paak album Ventura'' (2019). He chose not to attend the awards ceremony out of respect for Kobe Bryant who tragically died the morning of the awards.

References

External links
Official Instagram

1972 births
Living people
Hip hop record producers
American people of Palestinian descent
American hip hop singers
Record producers from California
Songwriters from California
People from Flint, Michigan
People from Los Angeles
Musicians from San Jose, California
American Muslims